The Saskatchewan Filmpool Cooperative is a non-profit artist-run organization that supports and assists independent filmmaking in the province of Saskatchewan.

History
Founded in 1977, the Saskatchewan Filmpool Cooperative has a proud history of promoting and assisting independent film production and its contribution to Saskatchewan’s cultural expression.

Description

The Filmpool provides its members with film and sound editing facilities, film and video production equipment, and opportunities for production, post-production and distribution funding.

The organization hosts a number of events, workshops and screenings each year, and also publishes the indie filmmaking magazine Splice.

The Filmpool membership’s objectives are met by a volunteer board of directors in co-operation with paid staff.

References

External links
Saskatchewan Filmpool Cooperative

Cinema of Saskatchewan
Organizations based in Regina, Saskatchewan
Film organizations in Canada
Filmmaker cooperatives
Media cooperatives in Canada